People's Movement is an Irish pressure group which campaigns on a number of issues such as protecting Irish neutrality and against greater European Union integration. The movement has also campaigned against the war on Iraq and the use of Shannon Airport by the US military.

Sponsors
Artist Robert Ballagh, former Teachta Dála (TD) Alderman Declan Bree, former Member of the European Parliament Patricia McKenna, Councillor Chris O'Leary, Bronwen Maher, Thomas Pringle TD, Councillor Cieran Perry, Catherine Connolly TD, Irish-language broadcaster and independent councillor Seosamh Ó Cuaig, and Professor John Maguire. The late Tony Gregory TD was also a patron.

Lisbon Treaty
The group actively campaigned against the constitutional amendment to ratify the (Treaty of Lisbon) stating that it would increase Ireland's involvement in military commitments of the EU, compromise workers' rights and reduce the accountability and power of the national parliament of Ireland.

The People's Movement made submissions to the National Forum on Europe setup in the aftermath of the rejection of the Lisbon Treaty.

References

External links
Peoples' Movement official website

Anti-militarism in Europe
Euroscepticism in Ireland
Political advocacy groups in the Republic of Ireland